Makaya may refer to:

Given name
 Makaya McCraven (born 1983), American jazz drummer and bandleader
 Makaya Nsilulu (born 1977), DR Congo footballer
 Makaya Ntshoko (born 1939), South African drummer

Surname
 Francis Makaya (born 1975), Congolese footballer
 Françoise Makaya, Gabonese politician
 Henrino Makaya, Congolese footballer
 Julienne Mavoungou Makaya, Congolese politician
 Paulin Makaya (born 1966), Congolese politician

Other
 Monte Makaya, a steel, looping roller coaster at Terra Encantada in Rio de Janeiro, Brazil 
Surnames of Congolese origin
Kongo-language surnames